Vaniel Sirin (born 20 October 1989 in Delmas, Haiti) is a Haitian footballer who plays for club Sheikh Jamal Dhanmondi Club in Bangladesh League.

Career
Sirin played for the Haiti national football team at the 2009 CONCACAF Gold Cup, where he scored a goal in a group stage match against the United States.

He also capped for the national under-17 and national under-20 teams.

References

External links 
 
 

1989 births
Living people
Association football forwards
Haitian footballers
Haiti international footballers
2009 CONCACAF Gold Cup players
Expatriate footballers in Bangladesh
Haitian expatriate sportspeople in Bangladesh
Expatriate footballers in the Dominican Republic
Haitian expatriate sportspeople in the Dominican Republic
Haiti under-20 international footballers
Haiti youth international footballers